Lawrence Adams was an English politician.

Lawrence, Larry or Laurence Adams may also refer to:

Lawrence Adams (artist), awarded Logan Medal of the Arts
Lawrence Adams (American football)
Lawrence Adams (runner), see 1989 in athletics
Laurie Adams (Laurence Adams, born 1931), English footballer
Larry Adams (jockey) (born 1936), American jockey
Larry Adams (politician), Ohio politician